Denis Davydov may refer to

 Denis Davydov (1784–1839), Russian soldier-poet of the Napoleonic Wars
 Denis Davydov (footballer), Russian professional football striker